Tricia Sawyer born (April 6, 1968 in Pasadena, California) is an American make-up artist in the film and print industry.

Career
She has worked extensively in the motion picture industry as a personal artist to Sharon Stone, Lindsay Lohan, Sylvester Stallone, Gina Gershon, Kate Beckinsale, Brittany Murphy, Michael Douglas, Geena Davis, Scarlett Johansson and Jessica Alba. She has also done several films as department head, along with countless print campaigns, media, awards, and television shows. Sawyer's work for TV series Mad Men was nominated for Emmy Award in 2011.

Sawyer began her career at the Joe Blasco Make-Up School in Los Angeles at the age of 18.  After graduating, Sawyer started her film career working as an artist with Roger Corman's Concorde/New Horizons, and on several music videos, most notably productions for Alice Cooper, Ozzy Osbourne and Janet Jackson.

In 1992, Sawyer worked with Sharon Stone on "Where Sleeping Dogs Lie," which was the first of twenty feature films on which they would work together.
 
Sawyer joined the IATSE union at 22, and acted as department head on her first union film Sliver.

Sawyer became the spokesperson for Prescriptives Cosmetics in 1995 where she was responsible for the re-design of the existing color line up along with design of new collections.  After a four-year spokesperson run, she stayed on at Estée Lauder as an independent development consultant.

She is the CEO of Tricia Sawyer Beauty, Inc. which produces a variety of prosumer cosmetics, most notably Full Potential Foundation which contains 55% pigment as compared to the industry standard of 10% pigment.

Currently, Tricia is the department makeup head for the House Of Card series.

Life
She currently resides in the Homeland neighborhood of Baltimore, Maryland.

Filmography

Films

References

External links
 Tricia Sawyer Beauty, Inc.
 Tricia Sawyer TV
 

American make-up artists
Living people
1968 births